Raoul Bellanova (born 17 May 2000) is an Italian professional footballer who plays as a right-back for  club Inter Milan, on loan from Cagliari.

Early life 
Bellanova was born in Rho, in the province of Milan on 17 May 2000.

Club career 

Bellanova started playing at age 4, for Azzurra. In 2005, he moved to FC Parabiago, and in 2006 his contract was bought by AC Milan. From 2006 to 2019, Bellanova played for teams of various age groups at Milan's youth academy. In January 2019, after failing to negotiate a desired wage, he declined a professional contract offer from Milan.

Bordeaux
In July 2019, Bellanova was officially presented as a Bordeaux player. On 10 August 2019, he made his debut in senior football, starting in the opening match of the 2019–20 Ligue 1 season against Angers. Having made several positioning mistakes that led to three goals from his right flank, he was subbed off 63 minutes into the game by the team's coach Paulo Sousa.

Loan to Atalanta 
On 30 January 2020, Bellanova joined Atalanta on a 1.5-year loan with an option to purchase. He made his club and Serie A debut on 14 July in a 6–2 win against Brescia.

Loan to Pescara 
On 24 September 2020, Atalanta loaned him to Serie B club Pescara.

Cagliari
On 31 August 2021, he joined Cagliari on loan with an option-to-buy. On 31 May 2022, Cagliari exercised their option to sign the player permanently.

Loan to Inter Milan
On 6 July 2022, Inter Milan announced the signing of Bellanova on loan from Cagliari for the 2022–23 season.

International career 
In October 2017, Bellanova played in the qualifiers, He debuted on 4 October 2017, against Moldova, The match ended 4–0 for Italy. In November 2018, Bellanova played for Italy under-20 national team in a match against Germany.

On 12 November 2020, he made his debut with the Italy U21 playing as a starter in a qualifying match won 2–1 against Iceland in Reykjavík.

Style of play 
Bellanova is a physically strong, quick, fast, offensive-minded right-back with good defensive positioning and reading of the game. Besides his regular position of a full-back or wing-back on the right flank, he can also play as a centre-back (in both, three and four-player defensive line) or as a wide midfielder in a 3–5–2 formation.

Career statistics

Honours 
Inter Milan
 Supercoppa Italiana: 2022

References

External links 
 
  (archive)
 

Living people
2000 births
People from Rho, Lombardy
Italian footballers
Italian expatriate footballers
Italy under-21 international footballers
Italy youth international footballers
Association football fullbacks
Association football midfielders
Ligue 1 players
Serie A players
Serie B players
A.C. Milan players
FC Girondins de Bordeaux players
Atalanta B.C. players
Delfino Pescara 1936 players
Cagliari Calcio players
Inter Milan players
Italian expatriate sportspeople in France
Expatriate footballers in France
Footballers from Lombardy
Sportspeople from the Metropolitan City of Milan